WR  may refer to:

Arts and media
 W.R.: Mysteries of the Organism, a Serbian film,
 Wikipedia Review, an Internet forum for the discussion of Wikimedia projects, particularly the English Wikipedia.
Willie Revillame, a Philippine TV host
 Wiltshire Radio, original name of Heart Wiltshire, an English radio station

Businesses and organizations
 WR, IATA airline designator for WestJet Encore
 Welter Racing, a French sports car maker
 Western Railway zone, India

Places
 WR postcode area, England
 WR Draw, a bridge over the Passaic River, in New Jersey, US

Science and technology
 Band 3, a protein (HGNC code WR)
 Wasserman reaction is an antibody test for syphilis, based on complement-fixation
 Wolf-Rayet galaxy, a galaxy which contains large numbers of Wolf-Rayet stars
 Wreath product, a concept from group theory

Sport
 Wide receiver, a position in American football
 World record, the best result ever in for example a sport using measurement
 World Rugby, the international governing body for rugby union
 Work rate, in association football

Other uses
 , a digraph in certain languages
 Water Resistant mark, commonly stamped on the back of wrist watches
 War Robots, a game by Pixonic
 League of Legends: Wild Rift, the mobile version of the MOBA game League of Legends by Riot Games